Goslar Warrior 1973–1974 is a bronze sculpture by Henry Moore, catalogued as LH 641. It is approximately 3m long.

Casts
Seven casts were made. Two of the casts are publicly exhibited; one in the gardens of the Imperial Palace of Goslar in Goslar, Germany, and another in Santa Cruz, Tenerife.

The seventh and final cast of the Goslar Warrior sold at auction at Christies in London in February 2011 for £1.8 million.

See also
List of sculptures by Henry Moore

References

External links

 

1974 sculptures
Bronze sculptures in Germany
Bronze sculptures in Spain
Buildings and structures in Goslar (district)
Buildings and structures in Santa Cruz de Tenerife
Outdoor sculptures in Germany
Outdoor sculptures in the Canary Islands
Sculptures by Henry Moore
Tourist attractions in Tenerife

es:El Guerrero de Goslar
it:Il Guerriero di Goslar